Stenoma sciogama is a moth in the family Depressariidae. It was described by Edward Meyrick in 1930. It is found in Brazil (Bahia).

The wingspan is 18–20 mm for males and 22–23 mm for females. The forewings are light yellow-ochreous, in males sometimes with slight brownish shading along the posterior half of the costa, or a faint oblique fuscous shade from the costa beyond the middle. In females, the posterior half of the costa is sometimes infuscated, with an oval grey spot representing the plical stigma, some grey suffusion along the anterior half of the dorsum, the second discal stigma dark grey, a cloudy grey curved shade from the middle of the costa passing beyond this to a spot on the dorsum beyond the middle, and a curved grey dotted line from three-fourths of the costa to the dorsum before the tornus. The hindwings are whitish-ochreous.

References

Moths described in 1930
Taxa named by Edward Meyrick
Stenoma